Piñera is one of nine parishes (administrative divisions) in the Cudillero municipality, within the province and autonomous community of Asturias, in northern Spain. 

The population is 716 (INE 2007).

Villages
 Armayor
 Arancés
 Bustiellu
 Pepín
 Piñera
 El Pitu
 La Vana
 Veiga
 Villazaín

References

Parishes in Cudillero